Ritis K. Heldart (October 8, 1953 – January 4, 2014) was the Lieutenant Governor of Chuuk State from 2011 until his death in office in January 2014.

Heldart was born to the paramount chief Kolid Heldart, and Elina Toses Alanso of Nama, Mortlock Islands on October 8, 1953.  He was married to Linda Nakao Sonis, and they had six children.

References

1953 births
2014 deaths
Lieutenant Governors of Chuuk State